The Tasman Fracture is a   deep ocean trench off the south west coast of Tasmania.  It is located within the boundaries of the Tasman Fracture Commonwealth Marine Reserve which lies within the Tasmania Province of the Integrated Marine and Coastal Regionalisation of Australia.

See also
South-east Commonwealth Marine Reserve Network

Notes

External links
 Tasman Fracture Commonwealth Marine Reserve

Oceanic trenches
Exclusive economic zone of Australia